Capo Circeo Lighthouse is an active lighthouse in Lazio, Italy, located on Punto, about 3 kilometres west of San Felice Circeo.

History
The lighthouse has been active since 1866, and was built under the pontificate of Pope Pius IX. The lighthouse is composed of a keeper's house with an adjacent tower 18 metres high.

The lighthouse has a rotating view that emits flashes of white light every 5 seconds. The height of the focal plane above sea level is about 38 metres. It  is part of the Command Area Lighthouses of the Navy based in Naples, which deals with all the lights of the southern Tyrrhenian Sea.

See also
 List of lighthouses in Italy

References

External links
 Servizio Fari Marina Militare 

Lighthouses completed in 1866
Lighthouses in Italy
Buildings and structures in Lazio
1866 establishments in Italy